Melanie Müller (born 31 May 1996) is a Swiss footballer who plays as a midfielder for Swiss Women's Super League club FC Luzern and the Switzerland national team.

References

1996 births
Living people
Swiss women's footballers
Women's association football midfielders
Switzerland women's international footballers
FC Luzern Frauen players
Swiss Women's Super League players